Zhilino is a rural locality (a selo) in Kabansky District, Republic of Buryatia, Russia. The population was 171 as of 2010. There are 15 streets.

Geography 
Zhilino is located 45 km north of Kabansk (the district's administrative centre) by road. Novaya Derevnya is the nearest rural locality.

References 

Rural localities in Kabansky District